I'll Be Waiting may refer to:

A song:
"I'll Be Waiting" (The Offspring song), a 1989 single by The Offspring
"I'll Be Waiting" (Lenny Kravitz song), a single by Lenny Kravitz
"I'll Be Waiting", by Santana from the 1977 album Moonflower
"I'll Be Waiting", by Talisman from the 1990 album Talisman
"I'll Be Waiting", by Thunder from their 1995 album Behind Closed Doors
"I'll Be Waiting", by John Sykes from the 1997 album Loveland
"I'll Be Waiting", a 2001 single by Full Intention
"I'll Be Waiting", by Michael Franti & Spearhead from the 2010 album The Sound of Sunshine
"I'll Be Waiting", by Adele from the 2011 album 21
"I'll Be Waiting", by Bankstatement
"I'll Be Waiting", by Walk Off the Earth

I'll Be Waiting may also be:
A 1939 short story by Raymond Chandler
An episode of the television series Fallen Angels
A screenplay from the 1993 anthology Fallen Angels: Six Noir Tales Told for Television